Baliochila fusca is a butterfly in the family Lycaenidae. It is found in south-eastern Tanzania. Its habitat consists of montane forests.

On the Rondo Plateau, this species forms a mimetic ring with Baliochila latimarginata rondoensis, Congdonia duplex and Eresinopsides bamptoni. Adults have been recorded on wing in February and March.

References

Butterflies described in 2004
Poritiinae
Endemic fauna of Tanzania
Butterflies of Africa